The 2013 Categoría Primera B season was the 24th season since its founding and was officially called the 2013 Torneo Postobón for sponsorship reasons.

Format
The season consisted of two tournaments: the 'Torneo Apertura' and the 'Torneo Finalización'. Each tournament will have an identical format of eighteen rounds with a round of regional derbies in the ninth round. At the end of the first eighteen rounds, the eight best-placed team will advance to the Semifinal round where teams will be sorted into groups and play a short double Round-robin tournament group stage. The winner of each group will advance to the Final round, which will consist of two legs. The winner will advance to the season final at the end of the Torneo Finalización, with its winner being promoted to the Categoría Primera A.

Current teams

Torneo Apertura

First stage

Standings

Results

Semifinals
The Semifinal stage began on June 2 and ended on June 23. The eight teams that advanced were sorted into two groups of four teams. The winner of each group advanced to the finals.

Group A

Group B

Finals

Top goalscorers

Torneo Finalización

First stage

Standings

Results

Semifinals
The Semifinal stage began on October 26 and ended on November 18. The eight teams that advanced were sorted into two groups of four teams. The winner of each group advanced to the finals.

Group A

Group B

Finals

Top goalscorers

Final of the year

Promotion/relegation playoff
As the second worst team in the relegation table, Cúcuta Deportivo had to play a two-legged tie against Fortaleza, the 2013 Categoría Primera B runner-up. As the Primera A team, Cúcuta played the second leg at home. Fortaleza won the tie and as a result were promoted to the Primera A for the 2014 season, while Cúcuta Deportivo were relegated to the Primera B.

Aggregate table

References

Categoría Primera B seasons
2013 in Colombian football
Colombia